Heimlich may refer to:

Heimlich maneuver, a first aid procedure used to treat upper airway obstructions
Heimlich and Co., or Top Secret Spies, a spy-themed German-style board game
10637 Heimlich, main-belt asteroid
Heimlich, a Bavarian caterpillar in the 1998 Pixar animated film A Bug's Life
Chef Heimlich McMuseli, a goat chef in the animated TV series Camp Lazlo

People with the surname
Henry Heimlich (1920–2016), American surgeon
Luke Heimlich (born 1996), American baseball pitcher
William F. Heimlich (1911–1996), American intelligence officer and head of Radio in the American Sector in Berlin from 1948–1949
Wolfgang Heimlich (born 1917), German swimmer

German-language surnames
Germanic-language surnames
Surnames of German origin